Uncial 0134 (in the Gregory-Aland numbering), ε 84 (Soden), is a Greek uncial manuscript of the New Testament, dated paleographically to the 8th-century. Formerly it was labelled by Wh.

Description 
The codex contains a small part of the Mark 3:15-32; 5:16-31, on two parchment leaves (17 cm by 14 cm). Parchment is fine. The text is written in one column per page, 26 lines per page, in 21-24 letters in line. The letters are small. It has breathings and accents.

The Greek text of this codex is a representative of the Byzantine text-type. Aland placed it in Category V.

Currently it is dated by the INTF to the 8th-century.

The codex is located now at the Bodleian Library (Sedl. sup. 2, ff. 177-178) in Oxford.

See also 

 List of New Testament uncials
 Textual criticism

References

Further reading 

 Hermann von Soden, "Die Schriften des Neuen Testaments, in ihrer ältesten erreichbaren Textgestalt hergestellt auf Grund ihrer Textgeschichte," Verlag von Arthur Glaue, Berlin 1902, p. 80. 
 J. H. Greenlee, Nine uncial Palimpsests of the New Testament, S & D XXXIX (Salt Like City, 1968).

Greek New Testament uncials
8th-century biblical manuscripts
Bodleian Library collection